Sigma constant (σ constant) may refer to:
 Yamabe invariant, in mathematics
 a parameter of the Hammett equation in organic chemistry